Note: USS Lynx (SP-2) should not be confused with patrol vessel USS Lynx II SP-730, later USS SP-730, which served in the United States Navy during the same period.

The second USS Lynx (SP-2) was an armed motorboat that served in the United States Navy as a patrol vessel and aviation support craft from 1917 to 1919.
 
Lynx was built as a private motorboat of the same name in 1916 by the George Lawley & Son at Neponset, Massachusetts. Her owner, Nathaniel F. Ayers, had her built specifically for participation in the Coast Defense Reserve as part of the Preparedness Movement. During her time in private hands in 1916 and early 1917, she participated in Coast Defense Reserve exercises.

By March 1917 she was armed and had U.S. Navy personnel aboard. The United States entered World War I in April 1917, and the Navy officially purchased her from Ayers on 21 April 1917. She was commissioned as USS Lynx (SP-2) on 9 July 1917.

Lynx initially served as a patrol boat in the 2nd Naval District, based at Newport, Rhode Island. In August 1917 she moved to Europe, where she was assigned to aviation support duty.

Lynx returned to the United States after World War I, arriving at New York City from Europe on 30 March 1919. She was stricken from the Naval Vessel Register on 24 August 1919. For purposes of disposal, she was condemned to be burned, and was burned on 4 September 1919.

Notes

References

Department of the Navy: Naval Historical Center: Online Library of Selected Images: Civilian Ships: Lynx (Motor Boat, 1916). Served as USS Lynx (SP-2) in 1917-1919
NavSource Online: Section Patrol Craft Photo Archive Lynx (SP 2)

External links

Patrol vessels of the United States Navy
World War I patrol vessels of the United States
Ships built in Boston
1916 ships